Murder Most Horrid is a British black comedy anthology series starring Dawn French. It was broadcast on BBC Two for four series runs, in 1991, 1994, 1996 and 1999.

Created by Paul Smith, who also co-created Colin's Sandwich (with Terry Kyan, as noted below) and has written for The Brittas Empire, among other programmes, the series starred French as a different character in each episode. Many episodes were directed by Bob Spiers, who also worked with French on The Comic Strip Presents... and French and Saunders.

Format 

Most episodes parodied the thriller and murder mystery genres with one episode lampooning the trials and tribulations of being a children's presenter in general, and Blue Peter in particular. In 1998, this episode ("Murder at Tea Time") was repeated to celebrate the 40th anniversary of Blue Peter, as part of a section entitled "Spoof Peter", which also featured (among others) the Python skit "How to Do It".

Each episode was stand-alone, and the episodes were written by different writers or writing teams with several contributing multiple episodes across the four series. Among these writers, the pairing of series-creator Paul Smith with Terry Kyan (who had previously collaborated on Not the Nine O'Clock News and Alas Smith and Jones) is particularly notable. The two would subsequently create and write Bonjour la Classe, starring Nigel Planer.

Other series writers included Private Eye editor and Have I Got News For You stalwart Ian Hislop, Press Gang creator and Doctor Who showrunner Steven Moffat, award-winning children's author Anthony Horowitz, Nick Newman and John O'Farrell.

Episodes in series 1 mostly opened with French selecting and reading from a book, usually a quotation actually or allegedly from Shakespeare; series 2 onward dropped this opening. The series' theme song, which featured at the end of the episode, was sung by Ruby Turner. The lyrics changed between episodes, the penultimate line always a word rhyming with "horrid", sometimes humorously forced. The murders ranged from the straightforward to the bizarre, with the murder weapon shown on a pedestal during the end credits.

Episodes

Series 1 (1991)

Series 2 (1994)

Series 3 (1996)

Series 4 (1999)

Reception 

Reviewing the DVD release, Empire wrote: "Dawn French's first solo effort has been eclipsed by the wider success of her Vicar of Dibley, and of comedy partner Jennifer Saunders' Ab Fab. But this arguably sees French on her best form".

Awards 
 Murder Most Horrid won the 1994 British Comedy Award for Best TV Comedy Drama

Video and DVD releases

Video
Two videos of the series were released by the BBC in 1996, through BBC Worldwide/Talkback (the former of which became 2 | entertain). Both were released on 3 June 1996, the first containing three episodes from series one and the second, three episodes from series two.  These two series were not repeated on British television as often as the later series and, as a result, episodes not featured on the videos released by the BBC (The Case of the Missing, He Died A Death, Mrs Hat and Mrs Red, A Severe Case of Death, We All Hate Granny and Smashing Bird) have proven fairly difficult to view.

Murder Most Horrid: The Girl from Ipanema/A Determined Woman/Murder at Tea Time (BBCV5854) EAN: 5032680800767
Murder Most Horrid: Overkill/Lady Luck/Mangez Merveillac (BBCV5855) EAN: 5014503585525

DVD (Region 2)
Murder Most Horrid: Volume 1 was released by Fremantle Media on 10 March 2008. The second series was released on 10 September 2012, with the third on 8 April 2013 and the fourth being 28 October 2013.
Murder Most Horrid: The Complete Collection was released 18 November 2013 by Freemantle Media.

References

External links

 Comedy Guide
Murder Most Horrid at Phill.co.uk Comedy Guide

1991 British television series debuts
1999 British television series endings
1990s British black comedy television series
1990s British crime television series
BBC television comedy
Television series by Fremantle (company)
1990s British anthology television series
English-language television shows
Television shows set in the United Kingdom